Antham is a 2016 Indian Telugu-language suspense thriller film written and directed by GSSP Kalyan. The film stars Rashmi Gautam, Charandeep, Sudharshan, Vasudev and produced under the banner Charan Creations.

Plot
Kalyan Krishna (Charandeep) and Vanitha (Rashmi Gautham) are a working couple who lives in Hyderabad. Kalyan goes to Vijayawada for work, leaving his wife in Hyderabad. During his return journey, an unknown person (Vasudev) calls Kalyan and threatens to kidnap Vanitha if Kalyan does not oblige his demands. With no choice left and worried about the safety of his wife, Kalyan agrees to follow the instructions given by this unknown person. Who is this unknown person? How is he related to Kalyan and Vanitha? What does Kalyan have to do to save his wife? is the rest of the story.

Cast
Rashmi Gautam as Vanitha  
Charandeep as Kalyan Krishna
Vasudev
Sudharshan  
Sanjay
Hareen
Srikanth

Soundtrack

References

External links

2016 films
2010s Telugu-language films
2016 thriller films
Indian thriller films